Call of Duty (often acronymized to CoD) is a first-person shooter video game franchise published by Activision. Starting out in 2003, it first focused on games set in World War II. Over time, the series has seen games set in the midst of the Cold War, futuristic worlds, and the modern day. The games were first developed by Infinity Ward, then also by Treyarch and Sledgehammer Games. Several spin-off and handheld games were made by other developers. The most recent title, Call of Duty: Modern Warfare II, was released on October 28, 2022.

The series originally focused on the World War II setting, with Infinity Ward developing the first (2003) and second (2005) titles in the series and Treyarch developing the third (2006). Call of Duty 4: Modern Warfare (2007) introduced a new, modern setting, and proved to be the breakthrough title for the series, creating the Modern Warfare sub-series. The game's legacy also influenced the creation of a remastered version, released in 2016. Two other entries, Modern Warfare 2 (2009) and Modern Warfare 3 (2011), were made. The sub-series received a reboot with Modern Warfare in 2019, with a sequel released in 2022. Infinity Ward have also developed two games outside of the Modern Warfare sub-series, Ghosts (2013) and Infinite Warfare (2016). Treyarch made one last World War II-based game, World at War (2008), before releasing Black Ops (2010) and subsequently creating the Black Ops sub-series. Four other entries, Black Ops II (2012), III (2015), 4 (2018), and Cold War (2020) were made, the latter in conjunction with Raven Software. Sledgehammer Games, who were co-developers for Modern Warfare 3, have also developed three titles, Advanced Warfare (2014), WWII (2017), and Vanguard (2021).

, the series has sold over 400 million copies. Meanwhile, the games in the series have consistently released annually to blockbuster-level sales, the series is verified by the Guinness World Records as the best-selling first-person shooter game series. It is also the most successful video game franchise created in the United States and the fourth best-selling video game franchise of all time. Other products in the franchise include a line of action figures designed by Plan B Toys, a card game created by Upper Deck Company, Mega Bloks sets by Mega Brands, and a comic book miniseries published by WildStorm Productions.

Main series

World War II games

Call of Duty

Call of Duty is a first-person shooter video game based on id Tech 3, and was released on October 29, 2003. The game was developed by Infinity Ward and published by Activision. The game simulates the infantry and combined arms warfare of World War II. An expansion pack, Call of Duty: United Offensive, was developed by Gray Matter Studios with contributions from Pi Studios and produced by Activision. The game follows American and British paratroopers and the Red Army. The Mac OS X version of the game was ported by Aspyr Media. In late 2004, the N-Gage version was developed by Nokia and published by Activision. Other versions were released for PC, including Collector's Edition (with soundtrack and strategy guide), Game of the Year Edition (includes game updates), and the Deluxe Edition (which contains the United Offensive expansion and soundtrack; in Europe the soundtrack was not included). On September 22, 2006, Call of Duty, United Offensive, and Call of Duty 2 were released together as Call of Duty: War Chest for PC. Since November 12, 2007, Call of Duty games have been available for purchase via Valve's content delivery platform Steam.

Call of Duty 2

Call of Duty 2 is a first-person shooter video game and the sequel to Call of Duty. It was developed by Infinity Ward and published by Activision. The game is set during World War II and is experienced through the perspectives of soldiers in the Red Army, British Army, and United States Army. It was released on October 25, 2005, for Windows, November 15, 2005, for the Xbox 360, and June 13, 2006, for Mac OS X. Other versions were made for mobile phones, Pocket PCs, and smartphones.

Call of Duty 3

Call of Duty 3 is a first-person shooter and the third installment in the Call of Duty video game series. Released on November 7, 2006, the game was developed by Treyarch,and was the first major installment in the Call of Duty series not to be developed by Infinity Ward. It was also the first not to be released on the PC platform. It was released on the PlayStation 2, PlayStation 3, Wii, Xbox, and Xbox 360.

Call of Duty: WWII

Call of Duty: WWII is the fourteenth game in the series and was developed by Sledgehammer Games. It was released worldwide on November 3, 2017, for Windows, PlayStation 4 and Xbox One. The game is set in the European theatre, and is centered around a squad in the 1st Infantry Division, following their battles on the Western Front, and set mainly in the historical events of Operation Overlord.

Call of Duty: Vanguard

Call of Duty: Vanguard is the eighteenth game in the series and is developed by Sledgehammer Games, with Treyarch developing the game's Zombies mode. It was released on November 5, 2021, for PC, PlayStation 4, PlayStation 5, Xbox One and Xbox Series X/S. The story depicts the birth of special forces to face an emerging threat at the end of the war during various theaters of World War II.

Modern Warfare series

Call of Duty 4: Modern Warfare

Call of Duty 4: Modern Warfare is the fourth installment of the main series and was the first game in the Modern Warfare timeline. Developed by Infinity Ward, it is the first game in the series not to be set during World War II. The game was released for Windows, Nintendo DS, PlayStation 3, and Xbox 360 on November 7, 2007. Download and retail versions for Mac OS X were released by Aspyr in September 2008. As of May 2009, Call of Duty 4: Modern Warfare has sold over 13 million copies.

Call of Duty: Modern Warfare Remastered

Call of Duty: Modern Warfare Remastered is a remastered version of Call of Duty 4: Modern Warfare that was released alongside the Legacy Edition, Legacy Pro Edition and Digital Deluxe Edition of Call of Duty: Infinite Warfare on November 4, 2016, for PlayStation 4, Xbox One, and PC. It was later released standalone on June 27, 2017, for PS4, and July 27, 2017, for Xbox One and PC. The game was developed by Raven Software and executive produced by Infinity Ward.

Call of Duty: Modern Warfare 2

Call of Duty: Modern Warfare 2 is the sixth installment of the main series, and the second game in the Modern Warfare timeline. It was developed by Infinity Ward and published by Activision. Activision Blizzard announced Modern Warfare 2 on February 11, 2009. The game was released worldwide on November 10, 2009, for the Xbox 360, PlayStation 3 and Windows. A Nintendo DS iteration of the game, titled Call of Duty: Modern Warfare: Mobilized, was released alongside the game and the Wii port of Call of Duty: Modern Warfare. Modern Warfare 2 is the direct sequel to Call of Duty 4 and continues the same storyline, taking place five years after the first game and featuring several returning characters including Captain Price and "Soap" MacTavish.

Call of Duty: Modern Warfare 2 Campaign Remastered

A visually updated version of the original, it was released for PlayStation 4 on March 31, 2020, and for Xbox One and Windows on April 30, 2020. It only includes the campaign mode with no multiplayer and Spec Ops components. When purchased players can unlock various cosmetic items in 2019's Call of Duty: Modern Warfare and 2020's Call of Duty: Warzone.

Call of Duty: Modern Warfare 3

Call of Duty: Modern Warfare 3 is a first-person shooter video game. It is the eighth installment of the Call of Duty series and the third installment of the Modern Warfare arc. Due to a legal dispute between the game's publisher Activision and the former co-executives of Infinity Ward – which caused several lay-offs and departures within the company – Sledgehammer Games assisted in the development of the game, while Raven Software was brought in to make cosmetic changes to the menus of the game. The game was said to have been in development since only two weeks after the release of Call of Duty: Modern Warfare 2. Sledgehammer was aiming for a "bug free" first outing in the Call of Duty franchise, and had also set a goal for Metacritic review scores above 95 percent.

The game continues the story from the point at which it ended in the Call of Duty: Modern Warfare 2 and continues the fictional battle story between the United States and Russia, which evolves into the Third World War between NATO allied nations and ultra-nationalist Russia.

Call of Duty: Modern Warfare

Call of Duty: Modern Warfare is the sixteenth entry in the Call of Duty series and is also a reboot of the Modern Warfare series. The story has been described to be darker and more realistic than previous Call of Duty games. It is set in the Black Ops timeline, separate from the other Modern Warfare games (however, characters such as Captain Price and other fan favorites from the series make a return). The game was officially revealed on May 30, 2019, and released on October 25, 2019.

The second main battle royale installment in the Call of Duty franchise, titled Call of Duty: Warzone, was released in March 2020, as a part of the Call of Duty: Modern Warfare video game but does not require purchase of it. The title exceeded 50 million players in the first month after release.

Call of Duty: Modern Warfare II

Activision confirmed a sequel to the 2019 Modern Warfare game on February 11, 2022, to be developed by Infinity Ward. The game's logo and title was revealed on April 28, 2022. During Activision's 'Call Of Duty NEXT' broadcast on September 15, 2022, the game's multiplayer was fully revealed, along with details on the next version of Warzone and a mobile version of Warzone, both set to launch slightly after MWII's launch.

Call of Duty: Modern Warfare II was released on October 28, with Campaign Early Access for pre-orders on October 20.

Black Ops story arc

Call of Duty: World at War

Call of Duty: World at War, developed by Treyarch, is the fifth installment of the main series. Released after Modern Warfare, it returns to the World War II setting of earlier titles, featuring the Pacific theater and Eastern front. The game uses the same proprietary game engine as Call of Duty 4 and was released for the PC, PlayStation 3, Wii, Xbox 360 consoles and the Nintendo DS handheld in North America on November 11, 2008, and November 14, 2008, in Europe. As of June 2009, Call of Duty: World at War has sold over 11 million copies. It acts as a prologue for Treyarch's next game, Black Ops, which is in the same universe, sharing characters and story references.

Call of Duty: Black Ops

Call of Duty: Black Ops is the seventh installment in the series, the third developed by Treyarch and was published by Activision for release on November 9, 2010. It is the first game in the series to take place during the Cold War and also takes place partially in the Vietnam War. It was initially available for Windows, Xbox 360, and PlayStation 3 and was later released for the Wii as well as the Nintendo DS.

Call of Duty: Black Ops II

Call of Duty: Black Ops II is the ninth main installment in the series, developed by Treyarch and published by Activision. The game was revealed on May 1, 2012. It was the first game in the series to feature future warfare technology, and the campaign features multiple branching storylines driven by player choice and multiple endings. It was later released on November 12, 2012.

Call of Duty: Black Ops III

Call of Duty: Black Ops III is the twelfth main installment in the series, developed by Treyarch and published by Activision. The game was released on November 6, 2015.

Call of Duty: Black Ops 4

Call of Duty: Black Ops 4 is the fifteenth main installment in the series. It was developed by Treyarch and published by Activision. The game was released on October 12, 2018. It was the first featured Call of Duty game to forgo a single-player campaign game mode, focusing only at the multiplayer aspect of the game. The game also introduced an entirely new battle royale game mode, called Blackout, in addition to multiplayer and zombies co-op mode.

Call of Duty: Black Ops Cold War 

Call of Duty: Black Ops Cold War is the seventeenth main installment in the series. It was developed by Treyarch and Raven Software,and published by Activision. The game was released on November 13, 2020. Set during the 1980s and focusing on Soviet and American espionage during the Cold War, the game is chronologically set between Call of Duty: Black Ops and Black Ops II.

Standalone games

Call of Duty: Ghosts

Call of Duty: Ghosts is the tenth main installment in the series and was developed by Infinity Ward. The game was released on November 5, 2013. It was the first game to be developed for eighth-gen consoles such as PlayStation 4 and Xbox One.

Call of Duty: Advanced Warfare

Call of Duty: Advanced Warfare is the eleventh main installment in the series, developed by Sledgehammer Games with assistance from Raven Software and High Moon Studios. It was released in November 2014. The game was the first game in the series to feature advanced movements, such as double jump and boost slide.

Call of Duty: Infinite Warfare

Call of Duty: Infinite Warfare is the thirteenth main installment in the series, developed by Infinity Ward, and was published by Activision. The game was released on November 4, 2016.

Primary developer rotation
In 2006, Treyarch released Call of Duty 3, their first Call of Duty game of the main series. Treyarch and Infinity Ward signed a contract stating that the producer of each upcoming title in the series would alternate between the two companies. In 2010, Sledgehammer Games announced they were working on a main series title for the franchise. This game was postponed in order to help Infinity Ward produce Modern Warfare 3. In 2014, it was confirmed that Sledgehammer Games would produce the 2014 title, Call of Duty: Advanced Warfare, and the studios would begin a three-year rotation. After Sledgehammer developed Call of Duty: WWII (2017), they began developing a new Call of Duty entry alongside Raven Software due for release in 2020. However, there were conflicts of interest between the two, which resulted in Treyarch taking over control of the project in order to speed up the development process.

Other games

Console titles

Call of Duty: Finest Hour
Call of Duty: Finest Hour is the first console installment of Call of Duty and was released on the GameCube, PlayStation 2, and Xbox. The PlayStation 2 and Xbox versions of the game include an online multiplayer mode which supports up to 32 players. It also includes new game modes.

Call of Duty 2: Big Red One
Call of Duty 2: Big Red One is a spin-off of Call of Duty 2 developed by Treyarch and based on the American 1st Infantry Division's exploits during World War II. The game was released on GameCube, PlayStation 2, and Xbox.

Call of Duty: World at War – Final Fronts
Call of Duty: World at War – Final Fronts is the PlayStation 2 adaptation of Call of Duty: World at War. Developed by Rebellion Developments, Final Fronts features three campaigns involving the U.S. fighting in the Pacific theater, the Battle of the Bulge, and the British advancing on the Rhine River into Germany.

Call of Duty: The War Collection
Call of Duty: The War Collection is a boxed set compilation of Call of Duty 2, Call of Duty 3 and Call of Duty: World at War. It was released for the Xbox 360 on June 1, 2010.

Handheld titles

Call of Duty: Roads to Victory
Call of Duty: Roads to Victory is a PSP game which is a portable spin-off of Call of Duty 3.

Call of Duty: Modern Warfare: Mobilized
Call of Duty: Modern Warfare: Mobilized is the Nintendo DS companion game for Modern Warfare 2. Developed by n-Space, the game takes place in the same setting as the main console game but follows a different storyline and cast of characters. Playing as the S.A.S. and the Marines in campaign mode, both forces are trying to find a nuclear bomb.

Call of Duty: Black Ops DS
Call of Duty: Black Ops DS is the Nintendo DS companion game for Black Ops. Developed by n-Space, the game takes place in the same setting as the main console game, but follows a different storyline and cast of characters.

Call of Duty: Black Ops: Declassified
Call of Duty: Black Ops: Declassified is a PlayStation Vita Call of Duty game.

Free-to-play titles

Call of Duty Online

Call of Duty Online was announced by Activision when the company first stated their interest in a Massively multiplayer online game (MMO) in early 2011. By then, it had been in development for two years. Call of Duty Online is free-to-play for mainland China and is hosted by Tencent, since Activision had lost the publishing rights to Call of Duty and several other franchises in China due to a legal dispute on most of the gaming consoles (Xbox 360, PlayStation 3, and Wii).

Call of Duty: Warzone

Call of Duty: Warzone is an online battle royale game developed by Infinity Ward and Raven Software and released by Activision. The game was released on March 10, 2020, as part of Modern Warfare (2019), but can be downloaded without ownership of the former title. The game shares progression with, and uses gameplay items from Modern Warfare, as well as Black Ops Cold War and Vanguard following several integration updates to incorporate content from these titles. Activision has announced that a mobile version of Warzone was in development, slated to be released sometime in the future.

Call of Duty: Warzone 2.0

Call of Duty: Warzone 2.0 is the sequel to Warzone, also developed by Infinity Ward and Raven Software. The game was released on November 16, 2022, as part of a content update for Modern Warfare II. Like the previous iteration, Warzone 2.0 is available for separate download without requiring ownership of Modern Warfare II. In addition to sharing progression with the former title, the game is also linked to Warzone Mobile, a standalone mobile game that incorporates Modern Warfare II gameplay items while played on a separate map.

Mobile titles

Call of Duty: Modern Warfare 2: Force Recon
Call of Duty: Modern Warfare 2: Force Recon is the J2ME mobile version of Modern Warfare 2. Developed by Glu Mobile, the game takes place after 5 years Modern Warfare in Mexico.

Call of Duty: Zombies and Zombies 2
Call of Duty: World at War – Zombies is a first-person shooter video game developed by Ideaworks Game Studio and published by Activision for iOS. It is a spin-off of the Call of Duty series and based on the "Nazi Zombies" mode of Call of Duty: World at War.

Call of Duty: Strike Team

Call of Duty: Strike Team is a first and third-person shooter game developed by The Blast Furnace and published by Activision for iOS and Android. The game is set in 2020 with players tasked with leading a U.S. Joint Special Operations Team after the country "finds themselves in a war with an unknown enemy".

Call of Duty: Heroes 

Call of Duty: Heroes was a real-time strategy game developed by Faceroll Games and published by Activision for Android and iOS.

Call of Duty: Mobile

Call of Duty: Mobile is the franchise's mobile title for iOS and Android developed by Tencent Games' TiMi Studios. It was released on October 1, 2019. Previously, it was first announced on March 18, 2019, at the year's Game Developers Conference. As of October 4, 2019, the game has surpassed over 35 million downloads worldwide.

Call of Duty: Warzone Mobile
Call of Duty: Warzone Mobile is a mobile battle royale game developed by Digital Legends Entertainment in partnership with other Activision studios. The game shares progression with Modern Warfare II and Warzone 2.0 and uses their gameplay items but is played on separate maps. The game was released in early 2023 for the Australia region, with the first map being a ported version of Verdansk, which first appeared in the original Warzone.

Canceled titles

Call of Duty: Combined Forces
Call of Duty: Combined Forces was a proposed concept draft originally intended to be a sequel to Call of Duty: Finest Hour. However, due to multiple legal issues that arose between Spark Unlimited, Electronic Arts, and Activision as well as other production problems, the game's draft and scripts never came to be. The game was projected to cost $10.5 million to produce after Finest Hour was complete. Eventually, Activision deemed the pitch as more of an expansion than something entirely new, causing the company to reject the proposal and end their contract with Spark Unlimited shortly after.

Call of Duty: Devil's Brigade
Call of Duty: Devil's Brigade was a canceled first-person shooter for the Xbox 360 developed by Underground Entertainment. The game was set in World War II, mainly focusing on the Italian Campaign.

Call of Duty: Vietnam
Call of Duty: Vietnam was a third-person shooter set during the Vietnam War. It was in development for at least six to eight months at Sledgehammer Games. The development was stopped because Infinity Ward needed help finishing Call of Duty: Modern Warfare 3 due to the employee firings and departures in 2010.

Call of Duty: Roman Wars
Call of Duty: Roman Wars was a canceled third and first-person video game in the Call of Duty franchise. The game was set in ancient Rome, and allowed players to take control of famous historical figure Julius Caesar, along with "low grunts", and officers of the Tenth Legion. It was eventually canceled, as Activision had uncertainties about branding it as a Call of Duty title.

Other media

Comic books
Modern Warfare 2: Ghost is a six-part comic book mini-series based on Call of Duty: Modern Warfare 2. The storyline focuses on the backstory of the character Simon "Ghost" Riley. The series is published by WildStorm and the first issue was released on November 10, 2009, alongside the game.

Call of Duty: Zombies is a six-part comic book series published by Dark Horse Comics. The series ties in with the Zombies game mode of the Black Ops subseries developed by Treyarch. The series is co-written by Justin Jordan, Treyarch's Jason Blundell and Craig Houston. The series is illustrated by artist Jonathan Wayshak and colorist Dan Jackson. The cover arts are handled by artist Simon Bisley. The series was announced by Treyarch in July 2016, with the first issue slated for release in October. After a slight delay, the first issue was released on October 26, 2016. The five other issues were released in the months of 2017: issue #2 released on January 11, 2017; issue #3 released on March 1, 2017; issue #4 released on April 19, 2017; issue #5 released on June 21, 2017; and issue #6 released on August 23, 2017. A paperback edition containing all six issues was released on November 15, 2017.

Merchandise
The Call of Duty Real-Time Card Game was announced by card manufacturer Upper Deck.

In 2004, Activision, in cooperation with the companies Plan-B Toys and Radioactive Clown, released the "Call of Duty: Series 1" line of action figures, which included three American soldiers and three German soldiers from the World War II era. While the American G.I. action figure was made in 2004, Plan-B Toys later discontinued a controversial Nazi SS Guard action figure based on the Nazi Totenkopf officer seen in Call of Duty.

In 2008, McFarlane Toys announced their partnership with Activision to produce action figures for the Call of Duty series. McFarlane Toys' first series of action figures were released in October 2008 and consists of four different figures: Marine with Flamethrower, Marine Infantry, British Special Ops, and Marine with Machine Gun.

Short films
Find Makarov is a fan-made film that was well received by Call of Duty publishers, Activision, who contacted We Can Pretend and subsequently produced a second short film, Operation Kingfish.

Find Makarov: Operation Kingfish is a fan-made prequel to Call of Duty: Modern Warfare 2 and was first shown at Call of Duty XP. The video was produced by We Can Pretend, with visual effects by The Junction, and was endorsed by Activision. The video tells the story of how Captain Price ended up in a Russian Gulag set before the events of Modern Warfare 2.

Films
On November 6, 2015, upon the release of Black Ops III, The Hollywood Reporter reported that Activision Blizzard launched a production studio called Activision Blizzard Studios and are planning a live action Call of Duty cinematic universe in 2019. On February 16, 2018, it was announced that Stefano Sollima will direct the film. Days later, he told Metro UK that he is considering having both Tom Hardy and Chris Pine as the leads for the film. In an interview with FilmSlash, Sollima stated that the film will be a real soldier movie, not a war movie. On November 27, 2018, it was announced that Joe Robert Cole will be writing the sequel. Filming on the first film was supposed to start filming in Spring 2019 for a 2020 or 2021 release. In February 2020, Sollima revealed in an interview that the film is put on hold saying that it's not Activision's priority.

Esports
The Call of Duty games were used in esports, starting in 2006, alongside the game released at the time, Call of Duty 4: Modern Warfare. Over the years, the series has extended with releases such as Call of Duty: World at War, Call of Duty: Modern Warfare 2, Call of Duty: Black Ops, Call of Duty: Modern Warfare 3, Call of Duty: Black Ops II, and Call of Duty: Ghosts. Games are played in leagues like Major League Gaming.

Players can compete in ladders or tournaments. The ladders are divided into several sub ladders such as the singles ladder, doubles ladder, team ladder (3v3 – 6v6) and hardcore team ladder (3v3 – 6v6). The difference between the regular team ladder and the hardcore team ladder is the in-game settings and thus a rule differentiation. Winning ladder matches on a competitive website rewards the user with experience points which add up to give them an overall rank.

The tournaments offered on these websites provide players with the opportunity to win cash prizes and trophies. The trophies are registered and saved on the player's profile if/when they win a tournament, and the prize money is deposited into his or her bank account. Call of Duty: Ghosts was the most competitively played game in 2014, with an average of 15,000 teams participating every season.

For the past 6 seasons in competitive Call of Duty, Full Sail University has hosted a prize giveaway, giving $2,500 to the top team each season. The other ladders give out credits and medals registered on players' profiles. Tournaments hosted on the Call of Duty: Ghostss Arena give cost from 15 to 30 credits, thus averaging at a cost of about $18.75 per tournament. If the player competes with a team, the prize money is divided, and an equal cut is given to each player. Other tournaments with substantial prizes are hosted in specific cities and countries for LAN teams.

The biggest Call of Duty tournament hosted was Call of Duty: Experience 2011, a tournament that began when Call of Duty: Modern Warfare 3 was released.

Playing Call of Duty competitively is most popular in Europe and North America, with users who participate in tournaments and ladder matches daily.

Activision launched a 12 team Call of Duty League, following a similar city-based franchise structure as the Overwatch League, in January 2020. The league's teams include those from Atlanta, Chicago, Dallas, Florida, London, Minnesota, New York, Paris, Seattle and Toronto, and with two teams from Los Angeles, OpTic Gaming Los Angeles (now Los Angeles Thieves) and Los Angeles Guerrillas.

Call of Duty Endowment
The Call of Duty Endowment (CODE) is a nonprofit foundation created by Activision Blizzard to help find employment for U.S. military veterans. The first donation, consisting of $125,000, was presented to the Paralyzed Veterans of America.

Co-chairman General James L. Jones is a former U.S. National Security Advisor. Founder Robert Kotick is the CEO of Activision Blizzard. Upon its founding in 2009, the organization announced a commitment to create thousands of career opportunities for veterans, including those returning from the Middle East. Annual awards given by the endowment include the "Seal of Distinction", a $30,000 initial grant given to selected veteran's service organizations. In November 2014, the endowment launched the "Race to 1,000 Jobs" campaign to encourage gamers to donate money to and get involved in organizations that provide veterans with services. , the Call of Duty Endowment had provided around $12 million in grants to veterans' organizations in the United States, which has helped find jobs for 14,700 veterans.

On March 30, 2010, CODE presented 3,000 copies of Call of Duty: Modern Warfare 2, approximately $180,000 in value, to the U.S. Navy. The copies were delivered to over 300 ships and submarines as well as Navy Morale, Welfare, and Recreation facilities worldwide.

Controversies and legal matters

Modern Warfare 2 controversies

Modern Warfare 2 on release had a number of controversial matters. Most significantly, the level "No Russian" had the player experience a massacre of civilians at a Russian airport.

Fallout with Infinity Ward leadership

As Infinity Ward's founders Jason West and Vince Zampella started new contract negotiations to continue developing the Call of Duty Activision around 2007, a number of legal issues arose between Infinity Ward and Activision. Ultimately, West and Zampella were forced out of Infinity Ward, later forming Respawn Entertainment within Electronic Arts. West and Zampella, as well as several Infinity Ward staff that departed the studio alongside them to join Respawn, filed lawsuits against Activision related to unpaid royalties and bonuses.

Trademark infringement claims by AM General
AM General, the manufacturer of the Humvee, sued Activision in 2017 for using the Humvee in multiple Call of Duty games. A federal district judge gave Activision a summary motion in its favor to dismiss the case in April 2020, stating that the purpose of the use of the Humvee in the games, to provide military realism, was quite different from the trademark purpose that AM General had established, for selling to the military.

References

External links

 

 
Activision Blizzard franchises
Activision games
Esports games
First-person shooters
Multiplayer online games
Tencent
Third-person shooters
Video game franchises introduced in 2003
Video game franchises
Video games adapted into comics
Windows games
World War II video games